Jonathan Draai (born 7 April 1997) is a South African cricketer. He made his List A debut for Free State in the 2016–17 CSA Provincial One-Day Challenge on 9 October 2016. He made his first-class debut for Free State in the 2016–17 Sunfoil 3-Day Cup on 9 February 2017.

References

External links
 

1997 births
Living people
South African cricketers
Free State cricketers
Place of birth missing (living people)